Edgars Rihters (6 June 1887 – 16 March 1931) was a Russian Empire cyclist. He competed in two events at the 1912 Summer Olympics.

References

External links
 

1887 births
1931 deaths
Male cyclists from the Russian Empire
Cyclists at the 1912 Summer Olympics
Sportspeople from Riga